Manjalar originates from Palani Hills, Tamil Nadu and runs towards east and joins the Vaigai River near Koottathu. There are nine anicuts and nine tanks in this sub-basin.

The Manjalar Dam spans the river near Batlagundu.

See also
 Thalaiyar Falls
 Varaha River

References

 
Rivers of Tamil Nadu
Rivers of India